Kotri Dhaylan (कोटड़ी धायलान) is a Village in the Reengus Tehsil in State Rajasthan.

Demographics 
As per Census-2011 statistics, Kotri Dhaylan village has the total population of 3815 (of which 2015 are males while 1800 are females). Kotri Dhaylan village has higher literacy rate compared to Rajasthan. In 2011, literacy rate of Kotri Dhaylan village was 72.09 % compared to 66.11 % of Rajasthan. In Kotri Dhaylan Male literacy stands at 87.51 % while female literacy rate was 54.92 %

Doctors 
The villages of the Shekhawati region of Rajasthan are mostly known for military families.  The tradition of going to the army is going on in the families of most of the villages here.  But there is a village here which has chosen another way of service instead of protecting the border.  The special thing is that even in this genre, Shekhawati has created a record.  There are 1078 families in Kotri Dhayalan village of Sikar and 103 doctors have passed out from here so far.  All these doctors are providing services in different cities of the country including Delhi, Mumbai and Jaipur.  In the year 2021, Abhay Beniwal topped the village by scoring 645 marks out of 720 in the National Eligibility and Entrance Test (NEET) and is currently studying at Sardar Patel Medical College, Bikaner.

References